The Asberg is a hill, on the Rheinwesterwald Volcanic Ridge on the northern edge of the Linz Heights (Linzer Höhe). Until the 1970s it was the site of a basalt quarry.

Geography 
The Asberg lies in the east of the borough of Unkel (central section and summit) and the municipalities of Rheinbreitbach (northern section) and Erpel (southern section) and is highest point of each district. The stumpy dome (kuppe) of the Asberg rises above the surrounding plateau of the volcanic ridge by around 80 metres. Three flooded pits, with a total area of two hectares, are distributed over a distance of 500 metres to the west and east of the summit, the easternmost and largest lake containing zones of silting.

References

Literature 
 Jürgen Fuchs: Basalt vom Asberg. In: Heimat-Jahrbuch des Landkreises Neuwied 2008, S. 231–236.

External links 

 Cable car – Basalt from the Asberg
 FFH of Asberg bei Kalenborn
 Biotope complex of Asberg bei Kalenborn

Westerwald
Neuwied (district)
Mountains and hills of Rhineland-Palatinate
Mountains and hills of the Westerwald